Nicolás Valansi (born 11 April 1979) is an Argentine-Israeli footballer playing in Sportivo Chimichurri.

Playing career
Valansi competed in Israel with the Argentina national football team in the 2001 Maccabiah Games. Valansi was named the tournament MVP, and led Argentina to a gold medal victory over their Mexican counterparts.

Valansi was a central part of the midfield of Ironi Kiryat Shmona while they were in the Liga Leumit.

In 2009, the IFA discovered that Valansi was contracted with Maccabi Kafr Kanna even though he left the club. Kafr Kanna were fined, and had two points deducted from them in the league table.

Valansi played with Hapoel Hadera until he was released in January 2012. In 2013 he returned to Argentina, and now plays amateur side Sportivo Chimichurri from Uruguay.

Statistics

Footnotes

External links
 

1979 births
Israeli Jews
Israeli footballers
Jewish footballers
Living people
Jewish Argentine sportspeople
Maccabiah Games medalists in football
Maccabiah Games gold medalists for Argentina
Competitors at the 2001 Maccabiah Games
Argentine emigrants to Israel
Hapoel Ironi Kiryat Shmona F.C. players
Hapoel Ramat Gan F.C. players
Maccabi Kafr Kanna F.C. players
Hapoel Afula F.C. players
Hapoel Hadera F.C. players
Israeli people of Argentine-Jewish descent
Sportspeople of Argentine descent
Liga Leumit players
Association football midfielders